Stausee Margaritze is a lake of Carinthia, Austria.

Lakes of Carinthia (state)
Glockner Group